This article was split from List of museums in Texas

The list of museums in the Texas Panhandle encompasses museums defined for this context as institutions (including nonprofit organizations, government entities, and private businesses) that collect and care for objects of cultural, artistic, scientific, or historical interest and make their collections or related exhibits available for public viewing.  Museums that exist only in cyberspace (i.e., virtual museums) are not included.  Also included are non-profit art galleries and exhibit spaces.

Texas Panhandle
The Texas Panhandle is a region of the U.S. state of Texas consisting of the northernmost 26 counties in the state.  The panhandle is a rectangular area bordered by New Mexico to the west and Oklahoma to the north and east.  The Handbook of Texas defines the southern border of Swisher County to be the southern boundary of the Texas Panhandle region. 
   

According to the Panhandle Regional Planning Commission, the following counties constitute the Texas Panhandle:

Armstrong County 
Briscoe County 
Carson County
Castro County 
Childress County 
Collingsworth County 
Dallam County 
Deaf Smith County 
Donley County

Gray County
Hall County 
Hansford County 
Hartley County 
Hemphill County 
Hutchinson County 
Lipscomb County 
Moore County
Ochiltree County

Oldham County 
Parmer County 
Potter County
Randall County
Roberts County
Sherman County
Swisher County
Wheeler County

Museums in the Texas Panhandle, listed by county

Armstrong   - Donley

Gray

Hall  - Hutchinson

Lipscomb  - Oldham

Parmer  - Potter

Randall  - Wheeler

Defunct museums
 Texas Tornado Museum, Amarillo

See also

 List of museums in Texas
 List of museums in East Texas
 List of museums in the Texas Gulf Coast
 List of museums in North Texas
 List of museums in Central Texas
 List of museums in South Texas
 List of museums in West Texas

Resources
Texas Association of Museums
Historic House Museums in Texas

References

Panhandle
Museums
Blacksmith shops